IK Huge is a Swedish football club located in Gävle in Gävleborg County. The club has formerly also been playing bandy.

Background
Idrottsklubben Huge is a sports club from the district of Bomhus in Gävle.  The club was founded on 20 November 1927 through the merger of Kastets IF (formed 3 August 1920) and Bomhus IK (formed 10 July 1921).  IK Huge is best known for achieving two national championships in bandy in 1939 and 1940.  While the bandy section has been disbanded the club is still active in football and ice-hockey.  In the latter the club spent three seasons in the highest ice hockey league in 1949/50, 1950/51 and 1952/53.

Since their foundation IK Huge has participated mainly in the middle and lower divisions of the Swedish football league system.  The club currently plays in Division 3 Södra Norrland which is the fifth tier of Swedish football. They play their home matches at Kastvallen in Gävle.

IK Huge are affiliated to Gestriklands Fotbollförbund.

Recent history
In recent seasons IK Huge have competed in the following divisions:

2011 – Division III, Södra Norrland
2010 – Division III, Södra Norrland
2009 – Division III, Södra Norrland
2008 – Division III, Södra Norrland
2007 – Division III, Södra Norrland
2006 – Division IV, Gästrikland
2005 – Division IV, Gästrikland
2004 – Division IV, Gästrikland
2003 – Division IV, Gästrikland
2002 – Division III, Södra Norrland
2001 – Division III, Södra Norrland
2000 – Division IV, Gästrikland
1999 – Division IV, Gästrikland

Attendances

In recent seasons IK Huge have had the following average attendances:

Footnotes

External links
 IK Huge – Official website
 IK Huge on Facebook

Sport in Gävleborg County
Football clubs in Gävleborg County
Defunct bandy clubs in Sweden
Association football clubs established in 1927
Bandy clubs established in 1927
1927 establishments in Sweden